Waidhofen is a municipality  in the district of Neuburg-Schrobenhausen in Bavaria in Germany.

The former farmstead Hinterkaifeck, site of six murders in 1922, falls within this municipality and within the formerly existing municipality of Wangen.

References

Neuburg-Schrobenhausen